The Rovigo Photovoltaic Power Plant is a 70 MW solar photovoltaic (PV) plant in Northeast Italy, about 17 km west of Rovigo. Construction of the plant was started in March 2010 and was completed in November 2010 at a cost of 276 million euro. When completed, it was the largest single-operating PV plant in Europe.

The project, also called the San Bellino PV power plant, was developed by SunEdison and built by Isolux Corsán. In October 2010, SunEdison sold the project to infrastructure investor First Reserve for US$382 million, and remained responsible for operating and maintaining the plant.

See also 

 List of photovoltaic power stations
 Montalto di Castro Photovoltaic Power Station

References 

Photovoltaic power stations in Italy